Anni Anwander is a West German retired slalom canoeist who competed in the early-to-mid 1950s. She won a silver medal in the folding K-1 team event at the 1951 ICF Canoe Slalom World Championships in Steyr.

References

External links 
 Anni ANWANDER at CanoeSlalom.net

Medalists at the ICF Canoe Slalom World Championships
Possibly living people
West German female canoeists
Year of birth missing